is a Japanese scholar specializing in the study of media design, professor at Sapporo City University.

Takemura graduated from Nihon University in 1976 and received a master's degree from the same school in 1978.

References 

1954 births
Living people
Nihon University alumni